Coucy-le-Château-Auffrique is a commune in the Aisne department in Hauts-de-France in northern France.  Its population in 2019 was 992.

Geography
Coucy is located west of Laon on the road between Tergnier (north) and Soissons (south) north-northeast of Paris.

The river Ailette forms most of the commune's southern border.

Population

Personalities
 Henri Carette
 Moses ben Jacob of Coucy
 Samson of Coucy
 
 César de Vendôme, (born 7 June 1594)
 Ferdinand Stanislas Bigot (6 May 1809 – 1890), mayor of Coucy-le-Château in the 1870s 
 François Pipelet de Leury, (1722–1809), director of the Royal Academic Surgery, doctor of the royal family, mayor of Coucy-le-Château for thirty years.  Lieutenant of the first surgeon for the king.
 Enguerrand VII de Coucy
 Barbin Pierre Philibert (1819-1868) born in Coucy-le-Chateau, grandfather of the actor Rudolph Valentino.

Points of interests
 Ruins of the Château de Coucy. The modern town is squeezed into the space within the medieval walls.
 A medieval garden
 Domaine de la Grangère (a green space for the garden of the governor's house at the time) - landmark classified in 1931
 A church - rebuilt after World War I.
 The forest nearby Coucy is the place where the Paris Gun was located and first used in WWI.

See also
 Communes of the Aisne department
 List of medieval bridges in France

References

External links

 
 http://www.amvcc.com
 Tourist guide to the town
 Arms of this town
 Collection of old postcards from Coucy

Communes of Aisne
Aisne communes articles needing translation from French Wikipedia